Nights on the Road is a 1952 West German drama film directed by Rudolf Jugert and starring Hans Albers, Hildegard Knef, Marius Goring and Lucie Mannheim.

It was produced by the veteran Erich Pommer who had returned to Germany after years of exile. It is one of the more prominent German film noirs. It was acclaimed by German critics on its release and was awarded a prize at the Berlin Film Festival.

It was shot at the Bavaria Studios in Munich and on location in Frankfurt and various autobahns. The film's sets were designed by Rudolf Pfenninger and Ludwig Reiber. The production budget was around 900,000 deutschmarks.

Synopsis
A happily married truck driver meets a much younger woman one night on the road and begins a relationship with her, which ends with her being drawn into the company of her criminal associate Kurt.

Cast
 Hans Albers as Heinrich Schlueter, truck driver
 Hildegard Knef as Inge Hoffmann
 Lucie Mannheim as Anna, Schlueter's wife
 Marius Goring as Kurt Willbrandt
 Heinrich Gretler as Carl Falk, forwarder
 Gertrud Wolle as Frau Jaguweit
 Wolf Ackva as Klatte, chief of Broadway bar
 Hans Reiser as Franz
 Peter Martin Urtel as Hans Brunnhuber
 Hans Zesch-Ballot as Inspector Busch
 Karin Andersen as Lieschen Brunnhuber, Schlueter's daughter
 Johanna König as Dancer in Broadway bar
 Margot Hielscher as Singer
 Renate Feuereisen
 Heinz Berg
 Hans Elwenspoek
 Kurt Hinz
 Hans Pössenbacher
 Maria Riffa
 Else Mental

References

Bibliography 
 Hake, Sabine. German National Cinema. Routledge, 2013.
 Hardt, Usula. From Caligari to California: Erich Pommer's Life in the International Film Wars. Berghahn Books, 1996.
Spicer, Andrew. Historical Dictionary of Film Noir. Scarecrow Press, 2010.

External links 
 

1952 films
1952 drama films
German drama films
West German films
1950s German-language films
Films directed by Rudolf Jugert
Trucker films
Films set in Munich
Films set in Frankfurt
Bavaria Film films
Films produced by Erich Pommer
German black-and-white films
1950s German films
Films shot at Bavaria Studios